Jackie Nyaminde (born 1983) is a Kenyan actress whose stage names are Wilbroda and Awilo.

Early life 
Nyaminde was born on 12 October 1983, and raised in Nairobi West, Langata and Rongai in Kajiado County. She was the first born into a family of six and she attended Kongoni Primary School and Uhuru Gardens Primary school in Nairobi, for secondary education she attended Koru Girls High School in Kisumu County.

Career 
Nyaminde studied a short course on Film production after high school. Her acting started at the Kenya National Theatre more than 16 years ago. She travelled to different parts of the country visiting High Schools to perform set books with other Kenyan actors. She acts at a local popular show Papa Shirandula which is aired on Citizen TV.

She  has been a radio presenter with a number of Kenya Radio station and currently working at Milele Fm, co hosting with Alex Mwakideu on the Morning Show. . She has  worked at Citizen radio alongside Inspekta Mwala and Luchivya. She is also  a philanthropist who formed her own charity with some of her fellow comedians. She champions many causes, among them child health and hygiene.

References 

Living people
Kenyan stage actresses
People from Nairobi
1983 births
21st-century Kenyan actresses